The Macintosh IIci is a personal computer designed, manufactured, and sold by Apple Computer, Inc. from September 1989 to February 1993. It is a more powerful version of the Macintosh IIcx, released earlier that year, and shares the same compact case design.  With three NuBus expansion slots and a Processor Direct Slot, the IIci also improved upon the IIcx's 16 MHz Motorola 68030 CPU and 68882 FPU, replacing them with 25 MHz versions of these chips.

The Macintosh Quadra 700 was introduced at the end of 1991 as Apple's mainstream workstation product to replace the IIci, albeit at a significantly higher price point: by this time, Apple authorized resellers were offering entry-level IIci systems for US$4,000 or less, whereas the Quadra 700 entered the market above US$6,000.  Because of this, Apple continued to sell the IIci until early 1993 when the less expensive Quadra 650 and comparably-priced Quadra 800 were introduced.

Hardware 

The IIci introduced several technical and architectural enhancements, some of which were important in preparing for System 7 (which was then called the Blue project) and would influence future Macintoshes, though some of them came at the cost of compatibility:
 a new, 32-bit clean ROM with built-in 32-bit QuickDraw that consists of two parts: one part that is the same across all Macintoshes, and another area (called the overpatch area) that is specific to each Macintosh.
 discontiguous physical memory that is mapped into a contiguous memory area by the MMU. Some of the System 7 virtual memory functions had to be added to the ROM to support getting the physical address of the memory.
 an optional 32 KB Level 2 cache. The cache card, which fit into the Processor Direct Slot (initially called a "cache connector" by Apple), was later included in all systems at no charge. Third-party cards offered up to 128 KB, but the added cache size yielded little benefit over the base card.
 a first for a modular Macintosh — onboard graphics for an external display. This freed one of the system's three NuBus slots. However, because the integrated graphics used the system's RAM for its frame buffer, some users used a NuBus graphics card to reclaim the lost memory. Also, it was popular to install faster memory in the first bank of SIMM slots, as this is the bank used by the video subsystem. The onboard graphics supported up to 8-bit color at resolutions of either 640x480 or 512x384. 

The IIci was one of the most popular and longest-lived Macintosh models of the 20th century. For much of its lifespan, it was the business "workhorse" of the Macintosh line. For a short time in 1989, before the introduction of the 40 MHz Macintosh IIfx, the IIci was the fastest Mac available.

The IIci came with either a 40- or an 80-megabyte hard disk.

Upgradability
Possible upgrades include the 40 or 50 MHz DayStar PowerCache 68030, a 33 or 40 MHz DayStar Turbo 040, and the DayStar Turbo 601 PowerPC Upgrade running at either 66 MHz or 100 MHz. DayStar Digital, which was bought by XLR8, still holds the Daystar product logo and name for its line of products. 68030 and 68040 upgrades were also made by Sonnet, Diimo and other companies. The MicroMac DiiMO 030 accelerator was a 50MHz 68030 CPU with optional 68882 FPU, in a form factor which plugged directly into the IIci processor direct slot.

When the Quadra 700 was released in 1991, a logic board upgrade was made available for the IIci to upgrade it to the performance level of the Quadra.

Easter eggs
An easter egg exists in the IIci ROM.  If the system date is set to September 20, 1989 (the machine's release date) and the  keys are held during boot time, an image of the development team will be displayed.

The signatures of the product design team can be seen in the molded plastic of the case if one removes the motherboard.

Timeline

References 
 Macintosh Buyer's Guide, vol. 7 no. 3 (Summer 1990)

External links
 Macintosh IIci technical specification at apple.com

ci
IIci
IIci
IIci
Computer-related introductions in 1989